Zumbi was the last of the kings of the Quilombo dos Palmares.

Zumbi may also refer to:
"Zumbi" (song), a 1974 song by Brazilian samba-rock artist Jorge Ben
Zumbi (Rio de Janeiro), a neighbourhood in the North Zone of Rio de Janeiro, Brazil
Zumbi (footballer) (born 1980), Brazilian footballer
Zumbi, Ecuador, the seat of Centinela del Cóndor Canton
Zumbi (wrestler) 
Baba Zumbi (died 2021), co-founder of rap group Zion I

See also 
 Zombie (disambiguation)